The Battle of Pavia was fought between the Western Roman Empire under Orestes and the Germanic warrior Odoacer. Odoacer was the leader of a group of Herulian and Scirian mercenaries serving in the Roman army. Leading a mutiny of these troops, Odoacer defeated the Roman general Orestes near Pavia, executing Orestes. Odoacer thereafter marched on Ravenna, capturing the city and executing Orestes' son Paul. Odoacer overthrew the Roman emperor Romulus Augustus, also a son of Orestes, which marked the effective fall of the Western Roman Empire.

Sources
 

476
Pavia
Pavia
Pavia
Military history of Italy
Pavia